Fred Sheldon may refer to:

 Fred Sheldon (English footballer) (1871–?), English footballer for Stoke
 Fred Sheldon (Welsh footballer), Welsh footballer for Aberdare Athletic
 Frederick H. Sheldon (born 1951), American ornithologist